The Royal Award for Islamic Finance (RAIF)  is an international award given to an individual who has excelled in advancing Islamic finance. It was established in 2010 under the Malaysia International Islamic Financial Centre (MIFC) initiative and supported by Bank Negara Malaysia and Securities Commission Malaysia.

See also
 List of economics awards
 Muhammad VI Awards for the Holy Quran

References

External links
 www.mifc.com/award

Economics awards
Islamic economic jurisprudence
Awards established in 2010
Islamic awards
2010 establishments in Malaysia